Vinay Mishra is an Indian politician from Delhi belonging to Aam Aadmi Party. He is a member of the Delhi Legislative Assembly.

He completed MBA from  Indian Institute of Planning and Management, Delhi in 2006. He was elected as a member of the  Delhi Legislative Assembly from Dwarka on 11 February 2020.

Member of Legislative Assembly (2020 - present)
Since 2020, he is an elected member of the 7th Delhi Assembly.

Committee assignments of Delhi Legislative Assembly
 Member (2022-2023), Public Accounts Committee

Electoral performance

References 

Living people
Delhi MLAs 2020–2025
Aam Aadmi Party politicians from Delhi
Indian Institute of Planning and Management alumni
Businesspeople from Delhi
Year of birth missing (living people)